The Eurasian nomads were a large group of nomadic peoples from the Eurasian Steppe, who often appear in history as invaders of Europe, Western Asia, Central Asia, Eastern Asia, and South Asia.

A nomad is a member of people having no permanent abode, who travel from place to place to find fresh pasture for their livestock. The generic title encompasses the varied ethnic groups who have at times inhabited the steppes of Central Asia, Mongolia and what is now Russia and Ukraine. They domesticated the horse around 3500 BCE, vastly increasing the possibilities of nomadic life and subsequently their economy and culture emphasised horse breeding, horse riding and nomadic pastoralism; this usually involved trading with settled peoples around the steppe edges. They developed the chariot, wagon, cavalry and horse archery and introduced innovations such as the bridle, bit and stirrup and the very rapid rate at which innovations crossed the steppelands spread these widely, to be copied by settled peoples bordering the steppes. During the Iron Age, Scythian cultures emerged among the Eurasian nomads, which was characterized by a distinct Scythian art.

History 

Scythia was a loose state or federation covering most of the steppe, that originated as early as the 8th century BCE, composed mainly of people speaking Scythian languages and usually regarded as the first of the nomad empires. The Scythians were Iranic pastorialist tribes who dwelled the Eurasian Steppes from the Tarim Basin and Western Mongolia in Asia to as far as Sarmatia in modern day Ukraine and Russia. The Roman army hired Sarmatians as elite cavalrymen. Europe was exposed to several waves of invasions by horse people, including the Cimmerians. The Scythians and Sarmatians enjoyed a long age of dominion in the 1st Millennium BCE, but at the start of 1st Millennium CE they were displaced by waves of immigrations of other people, to the East, in the steppes east of the Caspian Sea. They were dislocated by the Yuezhi people and were forced to assimilate into them, and many of these Eastern Scythians (Saka) moved and settled in the Parthian Empire in the region later named as Sakastan.

The western Iranians, the Alans and Sarmatians, settled down and became the ruling elite of several eastern Slavic tribes
and some of these Iranians also assimilated into the Slavic cultures, while others retained their Iranian identity, and their languages are spoken today by the modern Ossetian people. Various peoples also expanded and contracted later in history, including the Magyars in the Early Middle Ages, the Mongols and Seljuks in the High Middle Ages, the Kalmuks and the Kyrgyz and later the Kazakhs up to modern times. The earliest example of an invasion by a horse people may have been by the Proto-Indo-Europeans themselves, following the domestication of the horse in the 4th millennium BCE (see Kurgan hypothesis). The Cimmerians were the earliest invading equestrian steppe nomads that are known in Eastern European sources. Their military strength was always based on cavalry, and they were among the first to have developed true cavalry.

Historically, areas to the north of China including Manchuria, Mongolia and Xinjiang were inhabited by nomadic tribes. Early periods in Chinese history involved conflict with the nomadic peoples to the west of the Wei valley. Texts from the Zhou dynasty (c. 1050–256 BCE) compare the Rong, Di and Qin dynasty to wolves, describing them as cruel and greedy. Iron and bronze were supplied from China. An early theory proposed by Owen Lattimore suggesting that the nomadic tribes could have been self-sufficient was criticized by later scholars, who questioned whether their raids may have been motivated by necessity rather than greed. Subsequent studies noted that nomadic demand for grain, textiles and ironware exceeded China's demand for Steppe goods. Anatoly Khazanov identified this imbalance in production as the cause of instability in the Steppe nomadic cultures. Later scholars argued that peace along China's northern border largely depended on whether the nomads could obtain the essential grains and textiles they needed through peaceful means such as trade or intermarriage. Several tribes organized to form the Xiongnu, a tribal confederation that gave the nomadic tribes the upper hand in their dealings with the settled agricultural Chinese people.

During the Tang dynasty, Turks would cross the Yellow River when it was frozen to raid China. Contemporary Tang sources noted the superiority of Turkic horses. Emperor Taizong wrote that the horses were "exceptionally superior to ordinary [horses]". The Xiajiasi (Kyrgyz) were a tributary tribe who controlled an area abundant in resources like gold, tin and iron. The Turks used the iron tribute paid by the Kyrgyz to make weapons, armor and saddle parts. Turks were nomadic hunters and would sometimes conceal military activities under the pretense of hunting. Their raids into China were organized by a khagan and success in these campaigns had a significant influence on a tribal leader's prestige. In the 6th century the Göktürk Khaganate consolidated their dominance over the northern steppe region through a series of military victories against the Shiwei, Khitan, Rouran, Tuyuhun, Karakhoja and Yada. By the end of the 6th century, following the Göktürk civil war, the short-lived empire had split into the Eastern and Western Turkic Khaganates, before it was conquered by the Tang in 630 and 657, respectively.

Nomadism persists in the steppe lands, though it has generally been disapproved of by modern regimes, who have often discouraged it with varying degrees of coercion.

Chronological division 

Chronologically, there have been several "waves" of invasions of either Europe, the Near East, India and China from the steppe.
 	

Bronze Age
Proto-Indo-Europeans (see Indo-European migrations), Kurgan theory and the later Indo-Aryan migration

Iron AgeClassical Antiquity
Iranian peoples;  

Late Antiquity and Migration period  

Early Middle Ages
Turkic expansion, Magyar invasion; 

High Middle Ages to Early Modern period
Mongol Empire and continued Turkic expansion;

See also 
Eurasiatic languages
Inner Asia
Nomadic empire
Steppe Route
Lev Gumilyov

By region 

 Nomadic peoples of Europe
 Nomads of India

References

Bibliography 
 Amitai, Reuven; Biran, Michal (editors). Mongols, Turks, and others: Eurasian nomads and the sedentary world (Brill's Inner Asian Library, 11). Leiden: Brill, 2005.
 Drews, Robert. Early riders: The beginnings of mounted warfare in Asia and Europe. N.Y.: Routledge, 2004.
 Golden, Peter B. Nomads and their neighbours in the Russian Steppe: Turks, Khazars and Qipchaqs (Variorum Collected Studies). Aldershot: Ashgate, 2003.
 Hildinger, Erik. Warriors of the steppe: A military history of Central Asia, 500 B.C. to A.D. 1700. New York: Sarpedon Publishers, 1997 (hardcover); Cambridge, MA: Da Capo Press, 2001(paperback).
Kradin, Nikolay. 2004. Nomadic Empires in Evolutionary Perspective. In Alternatives of Social Evolution. Ed. by N.N. Kradin, A.V. Korotayev, Dmitri Bondarenko, V. de Munck, and P.K. Wason (p. 274–288). Vladivostok: Far Eastern Branch of the Russian Academy of Sciences; reprinted in: The Early State, Its Alternatives and Analogues. Ed. by Leonid Grinin et al. (р. 501–524). Volgograd: Uchitel'.
 Kradin, Nikolay N. 2002. Nomadism, Evolution, and World-Systems: Pastoral Societies in Theories of Historical Development. Journal of World-System Research 8: 368–388.
 *Kradin, Nikolay. 2003. Nomadic Empires: Origins, Rise, Decline. In Nomadic Pathways in Social Evolution. Ed. by N.N. Kradin, Dmitri Bondarenko, and T. Barfield (p. 73–87). Moscow: Center for Civilizational Studies, Russian Academy of Sciences.
 *Kradin, Nikolay. 2006. Cultural Complexity of Pastoral Nomads. World Cultures 15: 171–189.
 Kradin, Nikolay. Nomads of Inner Asia in Transition. Moscow: URSS, 2014.
 Littauer, Mary A.; Crouwel, Joost H.; Raulwing, Peter (Editor). Selected writings on chariots and other early vehicles, riding, and harness (Culture and history of the ancient Near East, 6). Leiden: Brill, 2002.
 Shippey, Thomas "Tom" A. Goths and Huns: The rediscovery of Northern culture in the nineteenth century, in The Medieval legacy: A symposium. Odense: University Press of Southern Denmark, 1981, pp. 51–69.

External links 

 Nomadic Art of the Eastern Eurasian Steppes, an exhibition catalog from The Metropolitan Museum of Art (fully available online as PDF), which contains material on Eurasian nomads
 Center for the Study of Eurasian Nomads

Pastoralists
Nomads
Nomadic groups in Eurasia
Nomads
Eastern European people
Central Asian people
East Asian people